The 1990–91 season of the Bayernliga, the third tier of the German football league system in the state of Bavaria at the time, was the 46th season of the league.

Overview
The league champions, TSV 1860 Munich, were promoted to the 2. Bundesliga after successfully competing in the promotion round. For 1860 Munich it was their second Bayernliga title after 1983–84 and ended a nine-season spell in the league after having been forcibly relegated from the 2. Bundesliga at the end of the 1981–82 season for financial reasons. For the club it marked the third time it competed in the promotion round to the 2. Bundesliga, having been unsuccessful on the previous two occasions in 1983–84 and 1985–86, the latter as the league runners-up when SpVgg Landshut had declined to apply for a 2. Bundesliga licence.

Runners-up SpVgg Unterhaching qualified for the German amateur championship, where it came second in the southern group and was knocked out.

The three bottom clubs were directly relegated from the league while 14th placed SpVgg Bayreuth had to enter the relegation round with the Landesliga runners-up where it secured its league place through victories over VfL Frohnlach and FC Gundelfingen. Of the relegated clubs, 1. FC Amberg returned in 1994 but folded at the end of the 1994–95 season, with a  new club, FC Amberg, formed as successor. VfB Helmbrechts returned to the Bayernliga in 1993 while Kickers Würzburg made a return in 1997.

Christian Radlmaier of TSV Eching was the league's top scorer with 20 goals, his first of two Bayernliga top scorer awards.

Table
The 1991–92 season saw six new clubs in the league, TSV Eching, SV Lohhof, Jahn Regensburg and Kickers Würzburg, all promoted from the Landesliga Bayern, while SpVgg Bayreuth and SpVgg Unterhaching had been relegated from the 2. Bundesliga to the league.	

For SV Lohhof it was the first-ever season in the league while Eching had last played in the league in 1986, Regensburg in 1988 and Würzburg in 1983. Of the two clubs relegated to the league Unterhaching had won it in 1988–89 and Bayreuth in 1986–87, both thereby earning promotion to the 2. Bundesliga.

2. Bundesliga promotion round
In the southern group the champions of the Oberliga Baden-Württemberg, Oberliga Hessen, Oberliga Südwest and the Bayernliga competed for one promotion spot to the 2. Bundesliga:

Bayernliga promotion round
The 14th placed Bayernliga team had to face the runners-up of the three Landesligas for one more place in the Bayernliga.

References

Sources

External links 
  of the Bavarian Football Association 

1990-91
3
1990–91 in European third tier association football leagues